Pupilla ficulnea  is a species  of minute air-breathing  land snail, a  terrestrial pulmonate gastropod mollusk or micromollusk in the family Pupillidae. This species is endemic to Australia.

References

Pupillidae
Gastropods described in 1894
Taxonomy articles created by Polbot